Yu Xin (born 23 February 1977) is a retired female discus thrower from PR China. Her personal best throw was 64.90 metres, achieved in July 2000 in Jinzhou. She also has 19.32 metres in the shot put.

She won the 1998 Asian Championships and finished thirteenth at the 2000 Olympic Games.

Achievements

References

1977 births
Living people
Chinese female discus throwers
Chinese female shot putters
Athletes (track and field) at the 2000 Summer Olympics
Olympic athletes of China